Bernard Gheur (born 1945 in Liège) is a Belgian writer and journalist. In 2007, he received a prize from the Belgian parliament for his reporting on immigration. He also received the Marcel Thiry prize in 2012 for his novel Les Étoiles de l'aube and the Prix des Lycéens in 2013.

References

1945 births
Belgian journalists
Male journalists
Belgian non-fiction writers
Living people